Hans Lengsfelder (October 19, 1903 in Vienna, Austria – February 6, 1979 in Hallandale Beach, Florida) was a composer and playwright who also wrote under the pen name(s): H.J. Lengsfelder, Harry Lenk and John Peters. He emigrated to the U.S. in 1939. He had mixed success with his Broadway musical comedies, but had considerable success with his songs.

Friends with Paramount Pictures A.J and Barney Balaban, Hans Lengsfelder was introduced by the Balabans to Joan Cohen Lengsfelder, whom he married November 10, 1942. The couple had two sons: Documentary filmmaker, TV writer/director and suspense/thriller novelist Peter (PG) Lengsfelder author of BEAUTIFUL TO THE BONE, A BOUNTY OF BONE, and OUR SONG, MEMENTO MORI, and experimental filmmaker John Lengsfelder, whose interactive film, "BLIND DATE," met with critical acclaim.

In addition to the Duke Ellington jazz standard  Perdido (written by Juan Tizol, Ervin Drake and Lengsfelder), which has been recorded by more than 30 musicians (including Sarah Vaughn, Dinah Washington, Art Tatum, Quincy Jones and Dave Brubeck), Hans Lengsfelder's songs and plays are still performed in Europe."Sag' Beim Abschied Leise Servus", recorded in the U.S. by Josephine Baker, Gloria Lynne and others, is still considered a classic in Europe. He is also known for his lyrics to "Eine kleine Fruhlingsweise" after A. Dvorak's Humoresques, Op. 101

External links
 Interview with Hans Lengsfelder (in German) in the online archive of the Österreichische Mediathek

1903 births
1979 deaths
20th-century Austrian composers
20th-century Austrian male musicians
Austrian jazz composers
Male jazz composers
20th-century jazz composers
Austrian emigrants to the United States